Christopher "Lil' C" Toler (born 1983) is an American dancer and choreographer best known for his choreography and judging on the TV show So You Think You Can Dance, and for his appearance in the 2005 krumping documentary Rize. Since appearing in the film he has danced for several musical artists including Missy Elliott, Fall Out Boy, and Madonna, and was cast as a featured dancer in the 2007 art exhibit Slow Dancing. He continues to serve as a guest judge on So You Think You Can Dance.

Career
Lil' C has appeared in music videos for artists such as Jennifer Lopez, Ciara, Missy Elliott, Christina Milian, Sean Paul, Fall Out Boy, Gwen Stefani, Seven, and Madonna. He has also choreographed for television programs and movies including Be Cool, Bones, the 2007 Teen Choice Awards, the 2007 NAACP Image Awards, and Bring It On Again. Other television credits include The 50th Annual Grammy Awards, VH1 Big in 06 Awards, and the 2005 American Music Awards. He also appeared in the films Stomp the Yard (2007), Center Stage: Turn It Up (2008), and You Got Served: Beat the World (2011).

Lil' C was featured in the 2005 documentary Rize, a film that documents the history of the krumping and clowning dance styles from Los Angeles.

Since 2006, Lil' C has been a judge and choreographer on the Fox reality dance competition So You Think You Can Dance. He choreographed one dance routine in season two, season four, season six, and season seven, and two routines in season three. Although he has not choreographed any dance numbers since season seven, he has still served as a guest judge. He has also choreographed for So You Think You Can Dance Canada. He choreographed two routines for the first season and another routine for the second season.

In 2007, Lil' C was cast in the David Michalek traveling exhibit Slow Dancing, "a series of 43 larger-than-life, hyper-slow-motion video portraits of dancers and choreographers from around the world, displayed on multiple screens. Each [dancer]'s movement (approximately 5 seconds long) was shot on a specially constructed set using a high-speed, high-definition camera recording at 1,000 frames per second (standard film captures 24 frames per second). The result is approximately 10 minutes of extreme slow motion." The exhibit has traveled to New York City, Los Angeles, Toronto, Venice, and London.

In 2010, Lil' C appeared in the second season of Dance Your Ass Off as a guest judge. He also played the character Z in the web series The Legion of Extraordinary Dancers.

See also
 List of dancers

References

External links
 

Slow Dancing exhibit

1983 births
People from Los Angeles
Dance teachers
American choreographers
So You Think You Can Dance choreographers
Participants in American reality television series
Living people
African-American male dancers
African-American dancers
American male dancers
African-American choreographers
American hip hop dancers
21st-century African-American people
20th-century African-American people